= Haiti Red Cross Society =

Organization

- Founded: May 29, 1932
- Type: Non-profit organisation
- Purpose: Humanitarian Aid
- Location: Haiti
- Affiliations: International Committee of the Red Cross; International Federation of Red Cross and Red Crescent Societies
- Website: https://www.ifrc.org/national-societies-directory/haiti-red-cross-society

The Haiti Red Cross Society was founded in 1932. Its first president was Dr. Rudolph Charmant. It has its headquarters in Port-au-Prince.
